Kent Tsai Fan-hsi (born Tsai Cheng-hung on 26 June 1997) is a Taiwanese actor.

Life and career 
Tsai made his acting debut in HBO Asia's first original series in Mandarin, The Teenage Psychic, in 2017. Also in the same year, he appeared in Giddens Ko's horror film Mon Mon Mon Monsters and starred in romance film All Because of Love.

Filmography

Television series

Film

Music video appearances

Awards and nominations

References

External links 

 
 
 
 

1997 births
Living people
Taiwanese male television actors
Taiwanese male film actors
21st-century Taiwanese male actors
Male actors from Tainan
Taipei City University of Science and Technology alumni